The Dragsvik railway station is located in Raseborg, Finland, in the village of Dragsvik. It is located along the Karis–Hanko railway, and its neighboring stations are Ekenäs in the west and Karis in the east.

Services 
Dragsvik is served by all regional trains on the Karis–Hanko line; the default type of rolling stock for this line is the Dm12 railbus.

References 

Raseborg
Railway stations in Uusimaa